The New Mexico Lobos are the athletic teams that represent the University of New Mexico, located in Albuquerque. The university participates in the NCAA Division I in the Mountain West Conference (MW) since 1999, after leaving the Western Athletic Conference. The university's athletic program fields teams in 16 varsity sports.

UNM teams have won 93 national championships. The women's cross-country won the NCAA championship in 2015 and 2017 and the Division I Skiing  championship in 2004.

History
The Lobos name began in 1920. A UNM Weekly student newspaper editor, George S. Bryan, came up with the teams' name, the "Lobos", which is the Spanish word for wolf. Previously the University's teams were referred to as the "University Boys" or "Varsities".

School colors
In the early years of the university, the school colors were black and gold. Tradition holds that in the 1890s, a faculty member suggested the school adopt colors more representative of New Mexico. Crimson and silver were initially suggested based on, respectively, the crimson evening glow of the Sandia Mountains and the description of the Rio Grande as a "silver ribbon winding through the valley" as seen by students and professors taking picnics in the Sandias. Crimson was later changed to the cherry color which is the color of the Sandia sunset. Cherry and Silver became the official colors in 1897. The school also used turquoise as an official color from 1973 to 1979.

The fight song
In 1930, the UNM fight song was created. Dean Lena Clauve, a music education professor, wrote the music. Dr. George St. Clair, an English professor, wrote the lyrics.

Mascot

The University mascots are anthropomorphized wolves or "Lobos" named Louie and Lucy, they appear at every sporting and social event. Lobo Louie was created in the early 1960s and Lobo Lucy was created in the early 1980s.

For a brief period in the 1920s, a live wolf pup appeared at every football game.  Jim Young, a government trapper, caught a wolf in the western part of the state.  A child teased the wolf at a game and was bitten, which forced officials of the school to get rid of the wolf.

Sports sponsored

The University of New Mexico sponsors teams in 7 men's and 9 women's NCAA sanctioned sports, competing in the Mountain West Conference.

Baseball
Current Head Coach: Tod Brown

Pitching Coach: Michael Lopez

Assistant Coach/Recruiting Coach: Nate Causey 

The Lobo baseball program began in 1899. Its current head coach is Tod Brown.

In recent years the Lobo Baseball Program has seen much success, the team competed in the 2010, 2011, 2012, and 2013 NCAA Division I Baseball Championship tournament. Prior to 2010 the Lobos hadn't made an appearance in the tournament since 1962. In 2012 the Lobos captured both the Mountain West Regular Season and Conference Tournament titles.  The Lobos have not made a College World Series appearance in its program's history.

UNM's baseball team plays at Santa Ana Star Field on the university's campus. They averaged 1,294 fans for the 2011 season and ranked 43rd in the NCAA per game.

Men's basketball

Current Head Coach: Richard Pitino

Assistant Coach: Andy Hill

Assistant Coach: Isaac Chew

Assistant Coach: Eric Brown 

The Lobo basketball programs were established in 1899, but began its first competitive teams in 1903 and 1906, respectively. In 1920 a head coach would be hired, Roy W. Johnson. The current head coach is Richard Pitino

Both men's and women's teams play in The Pit, formally known as Dreamstyle Arena, built in 1966. The Pit seats 15,411 spectators and ranks nationally in attendance for both men's and women's programs. Previously the Lobos played in Johnson Gymnasium and Carlisle Gymnasium, which both still exist on the main campus.

The Lobo men's basketball team has appeared in the NCAA tournament 14 times and have reached the second round seven times. UNM's most successful coaches in terms of wins are Dave Bliss, Bob King, Roy Johnson, and Steve Alford.

Women's basketball

Current Head Coach: Mike Bradbury
Assistant Coach: Valerie King
Assistant Coach: Keith Freeman

The Lobo women's basketball team has appeared in the NCAA tournament 8 times. Former head coach Don Flanagan (1999–2011) is the most successful coach in terms of wins.

Men's and women's cross country

Current Head Coach: Joe Franklin

Assistant Coach: James Butler

Assistant Coach: Dr. Richard Ceronie

Assistant Coach: Laura Bowerman 

The women's cross-country team at the University of New Mexico, known as the New Mexico Lobos, won the NCAA championship in 2015. In 2015, head coach Joe Franklin was named NCAA women's coach of the year for the NCAA Mountain Region and the NCAA nationally.

In 2017, UNM won the women's national team title, and Lobo Ednah Kurgat won the individual title. The Lobo women were second place nationally in 2018.

Football

Current Head Coach: Danny Gonzales
Assistant Coaches: 
 Offensive Coordinator/Tight Ends: Derek Warehime
 Defensive Coordinator: Rocky Long
 Specials Teams Coordinator/Running Backs: Jamie Christian
 Offensive Line: Jason Lenzmeier
 Defensive Line: Jerome Haywood
 Safeties: David Howes
 Corners: Troy Reffett 

The Lobo football program began in 1892, but compiled its first competitive team in 1894.

The Lobos were previously coached by Mike Locksley from 2009-2011. He was fired in late 2011 after a dismal 2–26 coaching record in  years at New Mexico. Locksley took the place of Rocky Long (1998–2008), who was the winningest coach in the school's history.

The Lobo football program has appeared in 12 bowl games since 1939. The Lobos have captured four wins in bowl games, including the 1946 Sun Bowl, the 1961 Aviation Bowl, and the 2007 and 2016 New Mexico Bowl.

UNM usually plays two large rivalry games each year with non-conference opponents, the Arizona Wildcats and the New Mexico State Aggies. The Rivalry with the Aggies is referred to as the "Rio Grande Rivalry", the rivalry first began in 1894. The Lobos have led the series since the 1940s; it stands at 66–31–5 in favor of the Lobos. The Rivalry with the Wildcats is referred to as the "Kit Carson Rifle"; the rivalry began in the early 1920s. The Wildcats of Arizona have led the series. The last meeting with the teams was in 2008. The Lobos defeated the Wildcats 36–28.

Men's golf
Current Head Coach: Glen Millican

Assistant Coach: Gustavo Morantes

Volunteer Coach: Sean Carlon

Dir of Player Personnel: Wright Zimmerly 

The men's golf team has won 24 conference championships:
Border Conference (3): 1948, 1949, 1950 (co-champion in 1948)
Mountain States Conference (6): 1957, 1958, 1959, 1960, 1991, 1962
Western Athletic Conference (8): 1963, 1964, 1965, 1967, 1979, 1989, 1993, 1996
Mountain West Conference (7): 2003, 2004, 2005, 2006, 2013, 2014, 2019

Many Lobo golfers have gone on to play and win on the PGA Tour including: Tommy Armour III (four wins), Charlie Beljan (one), Brad Bryant (one), Curt Byrum (one), Tom Byrum (one), and Tim Herron (four).

Women's golf 
Current Head Coach: Jill Trujillo

Associate Head Coach: Britney Choy

Women's soccer
Current Head Coach: Heather Dyche
Assistant Coach/Recruiting Coordinator: Karley Nelson
Assistant Coach: Paul Maestas

Softball
Head Softball Coach: Nicole Dickson

Assistant Coach: Morgan Spearman

The Lobos softball team has appeared in two Women's College World Series in 1980 and 1981.

Men's and Women's Track and Field
Current Head Coach: Joe Franklin

Joe Franklin is quoted as saying "We have to keep it fun"  Coach Franklin was at Purdue from 1986-1991. This upcoming year will be coach Franklin's fourteenth year as the Track and Field's head coach.

Franklin has led his team to 12 straight women's Mountain West titles.

Former varsity sports 

 Skiing - UNM skiing officially became an NCAA-sanctioned program in 1982.  They won a national championship in 2004. Citing financial issues, skiing was permanently eliminated in 2019. 
 Women's beach volleyball - Beach volleyball was permanently eliminated in 2019 due to financial issues.
 Men's soccer - in 2018, UNM men's soccer was permanently eliminated due to financial issues.
 Men's wrestling - in 1999, men's wrestling was permanently eliminated due to Title IX considerations and financial issues.
 Men's gymnastics - Men's gymnastics had 16 individual NCAA champions. In 1999, men's gymnastics was permanently eliminated due to Title IX considerations and financial issues.
 Men's swimming - in 1999, men's swimming was permanently eliminated due to Title IX considerations and financial issues.

Rivalries
 Kit Carson Rifle (Arizona Wildcats)
 Rio Grande Rivalry (New Mexico State Aggies)

Championships

NCAA team championships
New Mexico has won 3 NCAA team national championships.

Women's (2)
Cross Country (2): 2015, 2017
Co-ed (1)
Skiing (1): 2004
see also:
Mountain West Conference NCAA team championships
List of NCAA schools with the most NCAA Division I championships

National runners-up
 Division I Men's & Women's Skiing (1992, 2006)
 Division I Men's Soccer (2005)

Notable former Lobo athletes and coaches

Basketball 

 Bob King, former head coach and, "architect of Lobo basketball."
 Dave Bliss, winningest head coach at UNM
 Steve Alford, former head coach
 Ira Harge, former NBA and ABA player
 Mel Daniels, former NBA and ABA player
 Michael Cooper, former NBA player and 5-time NBA champion
 Luc Longley, former NBA player and 3-time NBA champion
 Kenny Thomas, former NBA player
 Danny Granger, former NBA player
 Darington Hobson, former NBA player
 Tony Snell, NBA player
 Cameron Bairstow, former NBA player

Football 

 Roy Johnson, former UNM athletic director and football/basketball coach

 Don Perkins, former NFL player
 Preston Dennard, former NFL player
 Brian Urlacher, former NFL player

Baseball 

 Mitch Garver, MLB player
 Jordan Pacheco, MLB player and current hitting coach for the Albuquerque Isotopes

Track and Field 

 Josh Kerr, 2020 Olympic Bronze 1500m Medalist

Golf 

 Tim Herron, former PGA tour player
 Tommy Armour III, former PGA tour player
 Charlie Belijan, former PGA tour player

See also
 List of college athletic programs in New Mexico

References

External links